Ciudad Magazine is an Argentine cable television channel owned and operated by Grupo Clarín from Buenos Aires. It can be accessed throughout the country via subscription television.

Programming 

Magazine produces several programmes, mostly outdoor and gossip shows. It also carries inexpensive syndicated programming, mainly old cartoons, telenovelas soap, series and movies.

Exclusive productions 

 Informadisimos
 Chimentero 3.0
 BDV

Independent productions 

 El mundo de la CONMEBOL
 Yes
 Donna Moda

Telenovelas 

 : Marimar
 : En Clon
 : Doña Bárbara
 : La Guerrera

External links

Television stations in Argentina